City of Syrup is the debut studio album by American rapper and Screwed Up Click member Big Moe. A "Wreckchopped and Screwed" version of this album was also released. The album produced two singles that were both released in 1999. Among the tracks included on these singles were "Maan!", which was initially written as a sort of response to the track "Whoa!" by Black Rob.

Track listing

Sample credits
City of Syrup
"Doo Wa Ditty (Blow That Thing)" by Zapp
Choppaz
 "Pop Life" by Prince
I Wonder
"I Wonder If I Take You Home" by Lisa Lisa & Cult Jam and Full Force
Leanin
"Feenin'" by Jodeci
Po' It Up
"Get It Up" by The Time

Charts

References

External links

Big Moe albums
2000 debut albums